Wenche Sjong  (born 27 April 1951) is a Norwegian artistic gymnast. 

She was born in Oslo. She competed at the 1968 Summer Olympics.

References

External links 
 

1951 births
Living people
Sportspeople from Oslo
Norwegian female artistic gymnasts
Olympic gymnasts of Norway
Gymnasts at the 1968 Summer Olympics
20th-century Norwegian women